Bear Branch is an unincorporated community in Pike Township, Ohio County, in the U.S. state of Indiana.

History
Bear Branch was founded in 1845. A post office was established at Bear Branch in 1849, and remained in operation until it was discontinued in 1937.

Geography

References

Unincorporated communities in Ohio County, Indiana
Unincorporated communities in Indiana